William Troy Balderson (born January 16, 1962) is an American politician and businessman serving as the U.S. representative from Ohio's 12th congressional district since 2018. He served as an Ohio state senator representing the 20th district from 2011 until his election to Congress. A member of the Republican Party, he was a member of the Ohio House of Representatives from 2009 to 2011.

Early life and education
Born and raised in southeastern Ohio, Balderson graduated from Zanesville High School in 1980 and attended both Muskingum College and the Ohio State University, but did not graduate. He lives in Zanesville.

Early career 
Balderson started working for his family's car business, Balderson Motor Sales, as a mechanic while a college student. He was vice president and general manager of the company from 1987 to 2008, the third generation of his family to run the business; his father had been in charge for a half-century. In financial disclosure statements, Balderson said he had no income from the car company since 2008; the company closed in February 2018.

Ohio General Assembly

House 
When incumbent Jim Aslanides became term-limited, Balderson sought the Republican nomination for state representative of the 94th Ohio House District. He won the March 2008 primary with 67.6% of the vote. In the November general election, Balderson won with 54.01% of the vote.

Balderson ran unopposed for reelection in 2010. While a member of the Ohio House of Representatives, he was on the House Finance Committee and chaired the Subcommittee on Agriculture and Natural Resources. In early 2010, Balderson proposed legislation that would subject Ohio Medicaid recipients to random drug tests in order to receive state benefits.

Senate
In late May 2011, State Senator Jimmy Stewart announced that he planned to resign his seat in the 20th Senate District as of June 30, the end of the fiscal year. Stewart continued his service as majority floor leader until he resigned.

On July 12, 2011, Senate President Tom Niehaus announced that Balderson would be appointed to the vacant Senate seat. He was sworn into office on July 13, 2011. On November 6, 2012, Balderson won a full four-year Senate term, defeating Democrat Teresa Scarmack with 59.79% of the vote.

Balderson was selected in 2014 as co-chair of a special legislative committee to review Ohio's renewable energy and energy efficiency regulations, and chaired the Senate Energy and Natural Resources Committee.

In 2016, Balderson ran unopposed for reelection. Because of term limits, he was ineligible to run again in 2020. He decided to run for Congress, to represent Ohio's 12th congressional district.

Committee assignments
Energy and Natural Resources (chair)
Finance
Government Oversight & Reform
Public Utilities
Finance Subcommittee on Primary & Secondary Education
Joint Committee on Agency Rule Review

U.S. House of Representatives

Elections

2018 special 
 
Balderson was the Republican nominee for Ohio's 12th congressional district in an August 7, 2018 special election triggered by the January 2018 resignation of Representative Pat Tiberi. He narrowly won the May Republican primary, with 20,101 votes (29.2%) to second-place finisher Melanie Leneghan's 19,437. Leneghan sued, asking to be declared the winner because of voting irregularities. The Ohio Supreme Court dismissed her suit in August 2018.

In the August election, Balderson faced Democratic nominee Danny O'Connor. On election night, the results were too close to call; Balderson was officially certified as the winner on August 24. After the remaining absentee and provisional ballots were counted, Balderson won by 1,680 votes (0.8%), and was sworn into office on September 5.

2018 general 

In the November general election, Balderson defeated O'Connor in a rematch of the district's August special election, with 51.6% of the vote to O'Connor's 47.1%.

2020 

Balderson sought reelection and defeated the Democratic nominee, businesswoman Alaina Shearer, with 55.2% of the vote to Shearer's 41.8%.

Tenure
On July 19, 2022, Balderson voted against the Respect for Marriage Act, a bill that would protect the right to gay marriage at a federal level.

Committee assignments
 Committee on Science, Space, and Technology
 Subcommittee on Oversight
 Subcommittee on Research and Technology
 Committee on Small Business
Subcommittee on Agriculture, Energy and Trade
Subcommittee on Economic Growth, Tax and Capital Access

Caucus memberships 

 Republican Governance Group
Republican Study Committee
 Republican Main Street Partnership
 House Automotive Caucus
 Congressional Motorcycle Caucus
 General Aviation Caucus
 Air Cargo Caucus
 Suburban Caucus
 Vision Caucus
 CTE Caucus
 Apprenticeship Caucus
 Smart Cities Caucus
 Community Health Centers Caucus
 Beef Caucus
 Taiwan Caucus
 Travel & Tourism Caucus
 Congressional Appalachian National Scenic Trail Caucus
 Congressional Grid Innovation Caucus
 Congressional Ohio River Basin Caucus
 Congressional Rural Caucus
 Congressional Second Amendment Caucus
 Congressional Small Business Caucus
 Auto Performance & Motorsports Caucus
 Congressional Motorsports Caucus
 Community College Caucus
 Auto Care Caucus
 Army Caucus
 Boating Caucus
 ALS Caucus
 Civility & Respect Caucus
 Manufacturing Caucus
 Congressional Study Group on Japan (FMC)
 Caucus on the Deadliest Cancers
 Franchise Caucus
 Veterans Education Caucus
 USO Caucus
 Appalachian National Scenic Trail Caucus
 Congressional Agritourism Caucus
 Macedonian American Caucus
 Women in STEM Caucus
 Congenital Heart Disease Congressional Caucus
 Cut Flower Caucus
 Congressional Telehealth Caucus
 Congressional Critical Materials Caucus
 Defense Industrial Base Caucus

Personal life
Balderson and his ex-wife Angela have a son. They divorced in 2014.

Electoral history

References

External links 

 Congressional website
 Campaign website
 
 

|-

|-

|-

1962 births
21st-century American politicians
Living people
Republican Party members of the Ohio House of Representatives
Republican Party Ohio state senators
Politicians from Zanesville, Ohio
Republican Party members of the United States House of Representatives from Ohio